Chugging can mean:

 the practice of so-called 'charity mugging' a form of street fundraising
 a form of rapid drinking.
 a type of rocket engine combustion instability when broken down
 palm muting